This is a list of airports in Haiti, grouped by type and sorted by location.

Haiti, officially the Republic of Haiti, is a Caribbean country. It occupies the western, smaller portion of the island of Hispaniola, which it shares with the Dominican Republic. Its capital is Port-au-Prince. The official languages are French and Haitian Creole.

Haiti is divided into ten departments, which are further divided into 42 arrondissements, and 145 communes and 571 communal sections.


Airports 

Airport names shown in bold indicate the airport has scheduled service on commercial airlines.

Airports by volume of traffic

 1.) Toussaint Louverture International Airport Port au Prince
 2.) Cap-Haïtien International Airport Cap-Haïtien
 3.) Port-de-Paix Airport Port-de-Paix 
 4.) Antoine-Simon Airport Les Cayes
 5.) Jérémie Airport Jérémie

Makeshift airstrips 
In the wake of the 7.0 magnitude 2010 Haiti earthquake of January 12, several makeshift airports have been set up around the country to facilitate aid shipments.

Outside of Léogâne, a makeshift airstrip has been set up on part of Route 9, a highway of the commune, able to handle small planes.

See also 
 Transport in Haiti
 List of airports by ICAO code: M#MT - Haiti
 Wikipedia: WikiProject Aviation/Airline destination lists: North America#Haiti

References
 
 
 UNJLC: Haiti Airfields

Footnotes

External links 
 Lists of airports in Haiti:
 Great Circle Mapper
 Aircraft Charter World
 The Airport Guide
 World Aero Data
 FallingRain.com
 MAF destinations

 
Haiti
Airports
Airports
Haiti